Ryan VandenBussche (born February 28, 1973) is a Canadian former professional ice hockey forward who played fourteen years of professional hockey, nine National Hockey League (NHL) seasons with the New York Rangers, Chicago Blackhawks, and Pittsburgh Penguins. He is best known for his pugilistic skills.

Playing career
Drafted by the Toronto Maple Leafs in the 1992 NHL Entry Draft, 8th round, 173rd overall, VandenBussche spent his first seasons playing for various OHL and AHL teams.

On August 22, 1995, he was signed as an unrestricted free agent by the New York Rangers. After two seasons in the AHL with the Rangers' farm team, the Binghamton Rangers, VandenBussche finally made his NHL debut for the 1996–97 season playing 11 games.

The very next season, 1997–98, VandenBussche was split between four different teams in three different leagues. He played three games for the Indianapolis Ice of the IHL, fifteen games for the Hartford Wolf Pack of the AHL, sixteen games for the New York Rangers of the NHL, and since the Rangers traded him for Ryan Risidore on March 29, 1998, four games for the Chicago Blackhawks of the NHL.

VandenBussche remained a Blackhawk until the Pittsburgh Penguins signed him as an unrestricted free agent on July 12, 2004. On September 25, 2006, Jokerit of SM-liiga signed the forward for a try-out, which was terminated on November 5. After his tryout, VandenBussche signed with the New Mexico Scorpions as a player/coach, but retired in January for medical reasons.

VandenBussche was not known as a goal scorer or play maker; in 310 NHL games, he scored 10 goals and 10 assists. VandenBussche's role was as an enforcer. He has the distinction of being pound for pound one of the toughest enforcers at the NHL level, and the man who ended the career of Nick Kypreos in a pre-season game in 1997.

Post career
VandenBussche and his wife Lisa currently sell real estate with his father Ron as Team VandenBussche with ReMax Erie Shores in Norfolk County, Ontario, Canada.
Ryan is the founder of a charity called Stix n Pix which promotes the development of grass-roots hockey and music within the community and surrounding area. He has also partnered with Canadian Tire First Shift Program, which is an initiative to help get youth involved in hockey. VandenBussche is also the founder/President of New Leaf Canada Inc. which is a Nutraceutical Health and Wellness company.  His role as an athlete ambassador advocates the benefits of plant based medicines.  

VandenBussche was awarded the civilian Canadian Forces Medallion for Distinguished Service in 2017 for his multiple visits to overseas military bases, starting with a ball hockey game in Kandahar, Afghanistan in 2010.

Career statistics

References

External links

Biography at Pittsburgh Penguins Official Website
tsn.ca

1973 births
Binghamton Rangers players
Canadian ice hockey right wingers
Canadian people of Dutch descent
Chicago Blackhawks players
Cornwall Royals (OHL) players
Guelph Storm players
Hartford Wolf Pack players
Ice hockey people from Ontario
Indianapolis Ice players
Jokerit players
Living people
Newmarket Royals players
New Mexico Scorpions (CHL) players
New York Rangers players
Norfolk Admirals players
Sportspeople from Norfolk County, Ontario
Pittsburgh Penguins players
Portland Pirates players
St. John's Maple Leafs players
Springfield Indians players
Toronto Maple Leafs draft picks
Wilkes-Barre/Scranton Penguins players
Canadian expatriate ice hockey players in Finland
Canadian expatriate ice hockey players in the United States